Antonio da Trento (1508–1550) was an Italian engraver. 

Da Trento was born in Trento. He specialized in chiaroscuro woodcuts, especially of religious themes and scenes. Da Trento probably first learned wood engraving from Ugo da Carpi.<ref name="ref2">{{cite book|url=https://books.google.com/books?id=K14OAAAAQAAJ&q=parmigiano+%22sybil%22&pg=PA367|title=A Biographical Dictionary; Containing an Historical Account of All the Engravers, From the Earliest Period of their Art to the Present Time] [etc.], Strutt, Joseph (1786), J. Davis, for Robert Faulder, London. Volume II, p. 367|accessdate=2010-03-30|last1=Strutt|first1=Joseph|year=1786}}</ref> He was later a disciple of Parmigianino, and afterwards within the School of Fontainebleau. 

Da Trento's technique involved creating three separate blocks for each print. The first was for the outlines, the second for shadows, and the third was for the lighter tints. Three documented works of his are The Beheading of St. Peter and St. Paul, The Tiburtine Sibyl showing the Virgin Mary, with the Infant Christ, and Psyche Saluted by the People with the Honors of Divinity''.

References

1508 births
1550 deaths
Italian engravers
16th-century Italian artists
Italian male artists
People from Trento